India participated in the 1970 Asian Games, held in the Bangkok, Thailand from December 9, 1970 to December 20, 1970. Indian athletes won total a 25 medals including six golds and finished at the fifth position in the medal's table.

Medals by sport

References

Nations at the 1970 Asian Games
1970
Asian Games